The 2012 FC Astana season was the fourth successive season that Astana played in the Kazakhstan Premier League, the highest tier of association football in Kazakhstan. They finished  the season in 5th place whilst also winning the Kazakhstan Cup, and as a result qualified for the Europa League for the first time.

Astana started the season under the management of Oleh Protasov, who'd replaced Holger Fach at the end of the 2011 season. Protasov left in April, with  Miroslav Beránek taking over as manager in May.

Squad

Transfers

Winter

In:

Out:

Summer

In:

Out:

Competitions

Premier League

Results summary

Results by round

Results

League table

Kazakhstan Cup

Squad statistics

Appearances and goals

|-
|colspan="14"|Players away from Astana on loan:

|-
|colspan="14"|Players who appeared for Astana that left during the season:

|}

Goal scorers

Clean sheets

Disciplinary record

References

FC Astana seasons
Astana
Astana